Diaperinae is a subfamily of darkling beetles in the family Tenebrionidae. There are more than 120 genera in Diaperinae, grouped into 11 tribes.

See also
 List of Diaperinae genera

References

Further reading

External links

 

Tenebrionidae